A Bernal chart (bər′nal ′chärt) in crystallography, is a chart used for indexing X-ray diffraction photographs from single crystals. From such a chart may be read the axial and radial cylindrical coordinates of that point in reciprocal space which corresponds to any particular X-ray reflection.

When a single crystal is examined in an X-ray diffractometer such that the diffraction intensity is measured cylindrically around the crystal, it is convenient to use cylindrical coordinates to define the reciprocal lattice vectors and their terminal points. Different order reflections will be coaxial with the axis of rotation. These reflections are recorded as spots which lie on parallel lines known as layer lines.

The vertical coordinate  has a special significance, since all the reciprocal lattice points which have a constant  value lie in the plane normal to the rotation axis. Such a plane corresponds to the oscillation line on the oscillation(rotation) photograph. Thus a layer line is characterized by a particular value . The zeroth layer line has  (i.e., the equatorial layer line), the first layer line has  and the second layer line has , and so on. Alternatively the reciprocal lattice points lie a long a cylinder with a constant  value whose axis is coincident with the rotation axis. If the crystal is mounted on the c-axis then the layer lines are related to the repeat distance along this axis. If H is the layer separation distance and R is the radius of the detector then

where  is the layer line angle.

A chart exhibiting such curves as they would appear on an X-ray photograph was first prepared by Bernal and is called a Bernal chart. The scale used in a given chart depends on the distance the detector is from the crystal.

See also
 Greninger chart
 John Desmond Bernal

References

X-ray crystallography